Zürich Leimbach is a railway station in the south-west of the Swiss city of Zürich, in the Leimbach quarter.  The station is on the Sihltal line, which is operated by the Sihltal Zürich Uetliberg Bahn (SZU).

The station is served by the following passenger trains:

References 

Leimbach